McCullough Creek may refer to:

McCullough Creek (British Columbia), a tributary of the Goldstream River
McCullough Creek (Florida), a stream in Polk County